Penland is a surname. Notable people with the surname include:

Casey Penland (born 1997), American soccer player
Ralph Penland (1953–2014), American jazz drummer
Theodore Penland, last commander of the Grand Army of the Republic

English-language surnames